Lankaran International Airport,  is an airport serving Lankaran, a city in Azerbaijan in the south-east of Azerbaijan. Reconstruction of the Lankaran airport started in 2005 and finished in 2008, when the Lankaran airport received the status of an international airport.

Facilities

Airlines and destinations

Statistics

See also
 Transport in Azerbaijan
 List of airports in Azerbaijan

References

Airports in Azerbaijan
Lankaran